200th may refer to:

200th (2/1st Surrey) Brigade, formation of the British Army during the First World War
200th (Winnipeg) Battalion, CEF, unit in the Canadian Expeditionary Force during the First World War
200th Airlift Squadron, unit of the Colorado Air National Guard 140th Wing located at Peterson Air Force Base
200th Coast Artillery (United States) (200 CA), United States Army unit during the first half of World War II
200th Division (National Revolutionary Army), the first mechanised division in the National Revolutionary Army
200th Independent Motor Rifle Brigade, military formation of the Russian Ground Forces based at Pechenga in Murmansk Oblast
200th Military Police Command (United States), the senior law enforcement unit within the U.S. Army Reserve
200th Street (disambiguation), a number of stations of the New York City Subway
200th Street (IRT Third Avenue Line), local station on the demolished IRT Third Avenue Line, near the New York Botanical Garden
200th Street (Manhattan)
Bedford Park Boulevard-200th Street (IRT Jerome Avenue Line station), local station on the IRT Jerome Avenue Line of the New York City Subway
Dyckman Street (200th Street), station on the IND Eighth Avenue Line of the New York City Subway
Pennsylvania's 200th Representative District
S. 200th (Link station) will be an elevated Sound Transit Link Light Rail Station in SeaTac, Washington
Cargo 200, which is often nicknamed as 200th one - in Soviet and post-Soviet military slang stands for a person who was killed in action.

See also
200 (number)
200 (disambiguation)
200, the year 200 (CC) of the Julian calendar
200 BC